Batman: Rise of Sin Tzu is a 2003 action beat 'em up video game released for the Xbox, PlayStation 2, Game Boy Advance and GameCube consoles. It was developed and published by Ubi Soft in conjunction with Warner Bros. Interactive Entertainment and DC Comics. The game is based on the television series The New Batman Adventures and features most of the voice actors reprising their roles. The story follows the Batfamily (Batman, Nightwing, Batgirl, and Robin) as they face a new adversary, a superpowered Asian warlord known as Sin Tzu, on the anniversary of Batman's parents' murder.

Batman: Rise of Sin Tzu received mixed reviews from critics. It was the final Batman game based on the DC Animated Universe.

Gameplay
Batman: Rise of Sin Tzu is a beat 'em up where players control either Batman (voiced by Kevin Conroy), Batgirl (Tara Strong), Robin (Scott Menville), or Nightwing (Loren Lester). While it can be played solo, the game also features a four-player cooperative multiplayer mode. Players can unlock upgrades for their character, such as new fighting moves, by completing levels and advancing through the game's storyline. There is also a challenge mode in which players (either cooperatively or competitively) take on groups of thugs without a storyline. The game features four difficulty levels: 'Easy', 'Medium', 'Hard', and 'Dark Knight', with the latter being an unlockable bonus.

The GameCube version includes support with the Game Boy Advance cable.

Plot
On the anniversary of the murder of his parents, Thomas and Martha Wayne, Batman takes a visit to Crime Alley to pay his respects to them, when he spots several civilians being kidnapped. After subduing the kidnappers, Batman learns of massive prison breakouts at both Arkham Asylum and Stonegate Prison. Commissioner James Gordon (Bob Hastings) contacts Batman to meet him at the courthouse, but is attacked by Scarecrow (Jeffrey Combs) and overcome by his fear gas. After defeating Scarecrow, Batman is informed by Gordon, who has recovered from the fear toxin's effects, that Scarecrow is not the only supervillain who has escaped, and sets out to find the others.

Eventually, Gordon notifies Batman of Clayface (Ron Perlman) having taken over the Gotham Chemical Factory. After defusing several bombs that were planted across the rooftops of Gotham City, Batman confronts Clayface, who reveals his plan to turn everyone in the city into clay creatures like himself and escapes. Batman follows him to the Chemical Factory, and along the way Gordon informs him of a weapon of mass destruction about to be brought in at the city docks. Batman eventually fights Clayface, who merges with other people like himself to grow larger, but is defeated by the Dark Knight using electricity.

During another conversation with Gordon, Batman deduces that the person responsible for the prison breakouts is Sin Tzu (Cary-Hiroyuki Tagawa), a renowned warlord from Asia that was captured and sent to Arkham Asylum for further study. Sin Tzu intercepts the transmission and declares that Gotham will become a new stronghold for his empire once Batman is defeated. Gordon then tells Batman that the doomsday weapon has just arrived, so he intercepts the cargo ship carrying it and takes it to the Batcave, just as Sin Tzu predicted. Batman finds the doomsday weapon but is ambushed by Sin Tzu's men, who try to break into the Batcave. After stopping them, he attempts to disarm the weapon only to find that it is Bane (Hector Elizondo), another escaped supervillain, whom he defeats.

Batman eventually discovers that Sin Tzu is hiding at Arkham Asylum and, while Gordon orders the GCPD to surround the asylum to prevent his escape, Batman infiltrates Arkham through the sewer system. During his infiltration, Gordon warns Batman of Sin Tzu's mind-controlling powers, which he had used to manipulate Scarecrow, Clayface, and Bane into fighting him. After making his way past Sin Tzu's men and several inmates, including the Joker, Harley Quinn, Mr. Freeze and Poison Ivy, who have been placed in suspended animation, Batman confronts Sin Tzu in a chamber in the lower levels of the asylum, resulting in the latter's defeat.

As dawn approaches, Gordon apologises to Batman for not telling him about Sin Tzu earlier, and explains that he had to keep his imprisonment at Arkham a secret for national security reasons, which the Dark Knight understands. As he retreats to look over Gotham City, Batman reminisces on the vows that have to be honored to the living and the dead, reminding himself of his parents' murder and how it inspired him to become the man he is today.

Publicity
One of the main draws to the game was that it introduced a new character into the Batman universe, as Batman: The Animated Series did with Harley Quinn. This new character, Sin Tzu, was created by comics artist Jim Lee. However, Sin Tzu did not gain popularity as a character and was not seen in any other media, with the exception of the game's novelization, for almost fifteen years before finally appearing in Suicide Squad Most Wanted: El Diablo and Killer Croc #3 (October 2016). The game shipped in regular versions with just the game, and boxed special editions that came with action figures for the Xbox and PS2 versions, and a lithograph with the GameCube version. Despite the special editions, Batman: Rise of Sin Tzu did not earn Greatest Hits, Player's Choice or Platinum Hits on the PlayStation 2, GameCube or Xbox respectively.

Other media
A novel based on the game with the same name was released around the same time of the games release date. The novel, written by Devin Grayson and Flint Dille (who wrote the game's script) was told in the first person, with Clayface, the Scarecrow, a Stonegate inmate named Freddie Galan, Bane, a Hispanic thug named Ramon Domingo, Sin Tzu, Batman, Batgirl, Robin, Nightwing, and Alfred each providing the narrative at different points.

Batman: Shadow of Sin Tzu was a year-long webcomic released bi-weekly on the DC Comics website, serving as a sequel to events depicted in Batman: Rise of Sin Tzu.

Reception

Batman: Rise of Sin Tzu received "mixed or average reviews", according to review aggregator Metacritic.

References

External links

2003 video games
3D beat 'em ups
Action video games
Cooperative video games
Sin Tzu
Game Boy Advance games
GameCube games
PlayStation 2 games
RenderWare games
Superhero video games
Ubisoft games
Video game sequels
Rise of Sin Tzu
Rise of Sin Tzu
Video games developed in Canada
Video games set in the United States
Warner Bros. video games
Xbox games
Games with GameCube-GBA connectivity
Multiplayer and single-player video games